James Bernard "Jamie" Walker is a Church of Scotland minister.

Walker was educated at Hamilton Academy, the University of Edinburgh and Merton College, Oxford. He was ordained in 1975. He served in Dundee and Galashiels. Walker was Principal of Queen's College, Birmingham from 1987 to 1993. After that he was at St Andrews University from 1993 to 2011, serving as Chaplain, Associate Director of Student Services and Assistant Director

References

Alumni of Merton College, Oxford
Living people
People educated at Hamilton Academy
Alumni of Ripon College Cuddesdon
Academics of the University of Edinburgh
Principals of Queen's College, Birmingham
20th-century Ministers of the Church of Scotland
Year of birth missing (living people)
21st-century Ministers of the Church of Scotland